Hinduism is a minority religion in Balochistan followed by 0.4% of the population of the province. It is the largest minority religion in Balochistan. The Balochistan is home to the shrine of Shri Hinglaj Mata temple, which is one of the most sacred Hindu temples. The annual Hinglaj Yatra to the temple is the largest Hindu pilgrimage in Pakistan.

History

Ancient era 
The earliest people in Balochistan were the Brahui people, a Dravidian speaking people closely related to the Dravidian speaking people of South India. They were originally Hindus and Buddhists. The Hindu Sewa Dynasty ruled much of region of Balochistan up until the 7th century AD. The Sibi division which was carved out of the Quetta division still derives its name from Rani Sewi, the queen of the Hindu Sewa dynasty. In , the Hindu Brahman dynasty of Sindh controlled parts of Balochistan.

Classical era 
During the 7th century, Arab forces invaded Balochistan subsequently converting a large majority of the Baloch people from Hinduism to Islam.

Colonial era 
During the colonial era, detailed decadal census reports covered Hinduism in the Baluchistan Agency of British India. The 1911 census counted a total of 38,326 Hindus in the province, forming approximately 4.6 percent of the total population. Of the total, 14,985 Hindus (39 percent) belonged to indigenous tribes of the Balochistan region, and 22,617 Hindus (59 percent) were migrants from other regions of the country. 

Being a religious minority in the region for centuries, colonial officials found that indigenous Baloch Hindus developed a form of religious syncretism that incorporated many aspects of Islam into their cultures and traditions, greatly differing from the forms of orthodox Hinduism practiced in other parts of the subcontinent. Furthermore, caste and family ancestry was often difficult to ascertain, as Hindus indigenous to the Balochistan region mainly solely identified as a member of their respective Baloch tribe, typically unknowing of their caste background.

The 1921 census counted a total of 51,348 Hindus in Balochistan, forming approximately 6.4 percent of the total population. Hindus belonging to the indigenous tribes of the Balochistan region numbered 17,479 persons and formed 34 percent of the total Hindu population, while migrants from other regions of the country numbered 33,869 persons or 66 percent of the total Hindu population.

The 1931 census counted a total of 53,681 Hindus in Balochistan, forming roughly 6.2 percent of the total population. Hindus associated with the indigenous tribes of the Balochistan region numbered 16,905 persons and formed nearly 31.5 percent of the total Hindu population. Conversely, migrants from other regions of the country numbered 36,776 persons and made up approximately 68.5 percent of the total Hindu population.

After the partition of British India and the ensuing creation of Pakistan, much of the Hindu Baloch migrated to India, particularly the Bhagnaris community.

Demographics 
According to the 1998 Census, Balochistan had approximately 39,000 Hindus (including the Scheduled Castes) constituting  0.59% of the population. In the 2017 Census, the absolute number of Hindus increased to 49,000 but their percentage decreased to 0.4%. However, Pakistan Hindu Council estimates that there are 117,345 Hindus in Balochistan.

1941 census

Districts 
At the district level in Baluchistan Agency, as per the 1941 census, the largest Hindu concentrations existed in Quetta–Pishin District (Hindus formed 18.32 percent of the total population and numbered 28,629 persons), Bolan District (15.81 percent or 950 persons), and Zhob District (6.97 percent or 4,286 persons).

Princely states

Community life

Only a minority of Baloch people are Hindus. There are Hindu Balochs in the Bugti, Marri, Rind, Bezenjo, Zehri, Mengal and other Baloch tribes.

Compared to the rest of the country, the Hindus in Balochistan province are relatively more secure and face less religious persecution. The tribal chiefs in Balochistan, particularly the Jams of Lasbela and Bugti of Dera Bugti, consider non-Muslims including Hindus as members of their own extended family and allows religious freedom. They have never forced Hindus to convert. In Balochistan Hindu places of worship are proportionate to their population. For example, between Uthal and Bela jurisdiction in Lasbela District, there are 18 temples for 5,000 Hindus living in the area, which is an indicator of religious freedom. However, in Khuzdar District and Kalat District, Hindus face discrimination.

The Hindu marriages in Punjab are registered under the Hindu marriage act of 2017. In Balochistan provincial assembly, there are three seats reserved for minorities. Hindus usually get elected on 1 or 2 seats.

Temples

See also
 Hinduism in Pakistan
 Punjabi Hindus
 Hinduism in Punjab, Pakistan
 Hinduism in Sindh Province
 Hinduism in Khyber Pakhtunkhwa

References

Further reading 
 Mohammad, Sahibzada Baz; Baloch, Fehmida. January–June, 2016. "HINDUISM IN BALOCHISTAN: LITERARY AND CULTURAL IMPACTS OF PASHTOONS AND BALOCHS ON HINDUS OF BALOCHISTAN". In TAKATOO, Volume 8, Issue 5. Pages 38–46.

External links 

Hinduism in Balochistan, Pakistan
Religion in Balochistan, Pakistan